Liuzhou Bailian Airport  is a dual-use military and civil airport serving the city of Liuzhou in Guangxi Zhuang Autonomous Region, China.

Airlines and destinations

See also
List of airports in China
List of the busiest airports in China
List of People's Liberation Army Air Force airbases

References

Airports in Guangxi
Chinese Air Force bases
Buildings and structures in Liuzhou